PLANDET (Urban Development Planning of Trujillo) is an agency of the Municipality of Trujillo in charge of urban development planning of the city, created by the Municipality of Trujillo with authority granted by the Organic Law of Municipalities, for the government of town. This agency specializes in urban planning support and it has specific functions on the territorial distribution of the city. It is responsible for developing planning documents such as the "Plan of comprehensive and sustainable development of Trujillo in 2015."

History
Plandet before was called PLANDEMETRU (Metropolitan Development Plan of Trujillo). Currently this agency of the MUnicipality of Trujillo is working continuously in the planning of the urban development of Trujillo city.

Functions
Among the main functions of Plandet are the following: To promote, develop, conduct, monitor and continuously assess and update  the management  and the execution of the Metropolitan Development Plan Trujillo and Local Plans de Desarrollo complementary, in coordination with relevant municipales.

Documents published
Metropolitan Development Plan of Trujillo 1995 - 2010.
Plan of comprehensive and sustainable development of Trujillo in 2015.

Related companies
 SEDALIB, company of water supply and sanitation in La Libertad Region.
 Caja Trujillo, company of banking.
 Municipality of Trujillo

See also

Historic Centre of Trujillo
Chan Chan
Huanchaco
Puerto Chicama
Chimu
Pacasmayo beach
Plaza de Armas of Trujillo
Moche
Víctor Larco Herrera District
Vista Alegre
Buenos Aires
Las Delicias beach
Independence of Trujillo
Wall of Trujillo
Santiago de Huamán
Lake Conache
Marinera Festival
Trujillo Spring Festival
Wetlands of Huanchaco
Association of Breeders and Owners of Paso Horses in La Libertad
Salaverry beach
Puerto Morín
Virú culture
Marcahuamachuco
Wiracochapampa

External links

 Map of Trujillo (Wikimapia)
 "Huaca de la luna and Huaca del sol"
 "Huacas del Sol y de la Luna Archaeological Complex", Official Website
 Information on El Brujo Archaeological Complex
 Chan Chan World Heritage Site, UNESCO
 Chan Chan conservation project
 Website about Trujillo, Reviews, Events, Business Directory
 Municipality of Trujillo

Multimedia
 
 
 
 Gallery pictures of Trujillo by Panoramio, Includes Geographical information by various authors
Colonial Trujillo photos

References

Trujillo, Peru
Urban planning